Ufa Governorate (Öfö gubernahı) was a governorate of the Russian Empire with its capital in the city Ufa. It was created in 1865 by separation from Orenburg Governorate. On June 14, 1922 the governorate was transformed into the Bashkir Autonomous Soviet Socialist Republic. It occupied an area of 122,005 km2 and the territory of the governorate was divided to 6 uyezds.

Population 
According to the 1865 data, the population of Ufa Governorate was 1,291,018. According to the 1897 Census it was 2,220,497; urban population was 48.9%. Bashkir people constituted 41% of total population; Russian people: 38%; Tatar people: 8.4%; Mari people: 3.7%; Chuvash people: 2.8%; Mordvins: 1.7%.

Economy 
Arable lands was about 35% of the governorate's total area. Industry was based on mining and metalworking; there were also food, clothing and timber industries.

Administrative division
Ufa Governorate consisted of the following uyezds (administrative centres in parentheses):
 Belebeyevsky Uyezd (Belebey)
 Birsky Uyezd (Birsk)
 Zlatoustovsky Uyezd (Zlatoust)
 Menzelinsky Uyezd (Menzelinsk)
 Sterlitamaksky Uyezd (Sterlitamak)
 Ufimsky Uyezd (Ufa)

Notable people
Guinan Khairy  was a Bashkir poet, writer and playwright.
Shaikhzada Babich was a Bashkir poet, writer and playwright.
Potapy Emelianov priest and confessor of the Russian Greek Catholic Church and, since 2003, a candidate for Roman Catholic Sainthood.
Baryi Kalimullin was a Russian architect, educator, and social activist.

References

Sources 

 Энциклопедический словарь Брокгауза и Ефрона: В 86 томах (82 т. и 4 доп.). — СПб., 1890–1907.

 
Governorates of the Russian Empire
1865 establishments in the Russian Empire
History of Ufa